Armanizam Dolah is a Singaporean footballer who played for Woodlands Wellington FC in the S.League. He is the team captain of the Rams. He currently works at Marina Bay Sands.

He played with Balestier Khalsa Football Club in the 2011 S-League season before rejoining his Tigers coach, Salim Moin, at Woodlands Wellington FC in 2012.

He is one of the many players who switched from Balestier to Woodlands in the 2011 off-season, the others being Ahmadulhaq Che Omar, K. Sathiaraj and Shamsurin Abdul Rahman.

Armanizam was singled out as one of the exciting players to watch in the 2012 S-League and he was named as one of the top 10 signings of the 2012 S-League season by Voxsports.

Following his impressive performances in the 2012 season, Armanizam was handed the captain's armband for the 2013 season after similarly impressing Woodlands head coach Salim Moin and his coaching panel as the team captain during the Rams' pre-season friendlies.

Club Career Statistics

Armanizam Dolah's Profile

All numbers encased in brackets signify substitute appearances.

References

Singaporean footballers
Living people
1987 births
Gombak United FC players
Balestier Khalsa FC players
Woodlands Wellington FC players
Singapore Premier League players
Association football midfielders